Herbert Brayley Collett  (12 November 1877 – 15 August 1947) was an Australian  politician, librarian and soldier.

Collett was born in St. Peter Port, Guernsey and arrived with his family in Western Australia in October 1884. He was educated at Perth Grammar School and became a librarian at the Victoria Public Library in 1891. He married Anne Whitfield in April 1904.

Collett joined the Metropolitan Rifle Volunteers at the age of 16 and rose to command the 11th Australian Infantry Regiment as a lieutenant colonel in 1908. With the outbreak of the First World War he commanded the 28th Battalion of the Australian Imperial Force from 23 April 1915 and he served at Gallipoli, in Egypt and Sinai and in France.  On 29 July 1916, he was wounded at the Battle of Pozières. He returned to action on 12 October 1917 at the First Battle of Passchendaele.  He was promoted to colonel in June 1918 and discharged in September 1919.  He was mentioned in despatches and was made a Companion of the Distinguished Service Order in 1917, a Companion of the Order of St Michael and St George in 1919 and was promoted brevet colonel.

Collett was assistant general secretary of Perth's amalgamated library, museum and art gallery from 1915 to 1933 and president of the Western Australia branch of the Returned Sailors and Soldiers' Imperial League from 1925 to 1933.

Political career
In April 1933, Collett was appointed to fill a casual vacancy in the Australian Senate, representing the United Australia Party.  In parliament he was particularly concerned with military matters and benefits for ex-servicemen and was Minister in charge of War Service Homes from April 1939 to June 1941, when he became Minister for Repatriation until the fall of the Fadden government in October 1941.  He was also Vice-President of the Executive Council and Minister in charge of Scientific and Industrial Research from August to October 1940.  He was defeated at the 1946 election, completing his Senate term in July 1947.  Shortly after he died of heart disease, survived by his wife and two sons.

Notes

External links
 
 

1877 births
1947 deaths
Australian Army officers
Australian military personnel of World War I
Australian Companions of the Distinguished Service Order
Australian Companions of the Order of St Michael and St George
Liberal Party of Australia members of the Parliament of Australia
Members of the Australian Senate
Members of the Australian Senate for Western Australia
Members of the Cabinet of Australia
Nationalist Party of Australia members of the Parliament of Australia
United Australia Party members of the Parliament of Australia
Guernsey people
Guernsey emigrants to Australia
20th-century Australian politicians
Burials at Karrakatta Cemetery